Oliver "Ollie" Stanhope  (born 30 May 1998) is a British Paralympic rower who competes in the coxed four in international level events. He is the son of former rower Richard Stanhope.

He won a gold medal in the mixed cox four at the 2020 Tokyo Paralympics.

Stanhope was appointed Member of the Order of the British Empire (MBE) in the 2022 New Year Honours for services to rowing.

References

External links

1998 births
Living people
People from Hampton, London
Paralympic rowers of Great Britain
British male rowers
Rowers at the 2020 Summer Paralympics
Medalists at the 2020 Summer Paralympics
Paralympic medalists in rowing
Paralympic gold medalists for Great Britain
Members of the Order of the British Empire